Boisar Assembly constituency is one of the 288 Vidhan Sabha (legislative assembly) constituencies of Maharashtra state, western India. This constituency is located in Palghar district. Rajesh Raghunath Patil is the current legislator of this constituency.

Geographical scope
The constituency comprises parts of Palghar taluka viz. revenue circles Saphala, Boisar and
Manor, parts of Vasai Taluka viz. revenue circles Mandvi, Waliv (CT),
and Gokhiware (CT).

Members of Legislative Assembly

Election results

2019 results

2014 results

2009 results

References

Assembly constituencies of Palghar district
Assembly constituencies of Maharashtra